St. Ludger Catholic Church is a historic Roman Catholic parish church located at Germantown, Henry County, Missouri.

The earliest parish record is from Dec. 1832, when a Dekon Tiof baptized John Freyrik, but the community was not assigned a permanent parish priest until 1840, when Joseph Rosati, Bishop of St. Louis named Fr. Henry Meinkmann as pastor. In the early days, the parish built a log church, replaced with another in 1842, and that by a permanent church in 1858. The church was named for Saint Ludger, first Bishop of Münster, as many families who settled in the area originated in Westphalia. The growth of Germantown stalled after 1871, however, when the Missouri–Kansas–Texas Railroad built tracks to nearby Montrose instead.

In August 1874, a Rocky Mountain locust plague struck large swathes of the Midwest, destroying the wheat, oats, and corn sown in May. According to Germantown and St. Ludger’s, 1833-2002, a history by Donna (Koch) Talbott, nearby farmers rushed to the church and “made a solemn promise before the Blessed Sacrament to keep May 1 holy if they would be averted from this plague.” The grasshoppers departed after the prayer service, and for the next 115 years, the parish held a public adoration of the Blessed Sacrament on May 1.

The current variegated red brick Romanesque Revival-style church building was completed in 1927. It sits on a concrete foundation and has a 60 foot tall bell tower. Also on the property is the contributing brick rectory constructed in 1942. It was listed on the National Register of Historic Places in 1998.

In 1990, the parish was suppressed and became a mission church of Immaculate Conception Parish in Montrose. The May 1 celebration was changed to an evening Mass, now held on the closest Saturday to May 1 and followed by a procession around the church and blessing of crops and farmlands with holy water.

References

Churches in the Roman Catholic Diocese of Kansas City–Saint Joseph
Romanesque Revival church buildings in Missouri
Churches completed in 1927
Churches on the National Register of Historic Places in Missouri
Buildings and structures in Henry County, Missouri
National Register of Historic Places in Henry County, Missouri
Religious organizations established in 1833
1990 disestablishments in Missouri